2020 college football season may refer to:

American leagues
2020 NCAA Division I FBS football season
2020–21 NCAA Division I FCS football season
2020–21 NCAA Division II football season
2020–21 NCAA Division III football season
2020 NAIA football season

Non-American leagues
2020 U Sports football season